Poura is a town in the Poura Department of Balé Province in southern Burkina Faso. The town has a population of 6,266 and is the capital of Poura Department.

References

External links
Satellite map at Maplandia.com

Populated places in the Boucle du Mouhoun Region
Balé Province